Aster MIMS (full name - Aster Malabar Institute of Medical Sciences) is a NABH accredited 950-bed super-specialty hospital located in Kozhikode, India. It is located on Mini Bypass Road, Opp Kovilakam Residency Govindapuram, Kozhikode, Kerala, India. Aster MIMS, a NABH-accredited hospital, is established with the aim to offer advanced medical treatment of international standards at affordable rates. MIMS has also established a 200-bed hospital at Changuvetty, Kottakkal, and in Chala, Kannur.

Features 
 100+ full-time doctors
 First multi-specialty hospital in the country to gain NABH accreditation
 Level IV Trauma care facility
 Intensive care facility
 Blood Bank with component separation facility
 The first Cochlear Implant Clinic in the State of Kerala
 Advanced Interventional Radiology
 State of the art Nuclear Medicine Department
 Round the clock availability of Interventional Cardiologists for Primary angioplasty
 24-hour availability of Neurologists for thrombolysis in stroke
 Integrated MIMS Academy with DNB, nursing, and paramedical courses.

Clinical and surgical departments
The departments at Aster MIMS include 
Anesthesiology
Cardiothoracic anesthesiology
Cardiology
Cardiothoracic Surgery
Dental Surgery
Dermatology
Emergency Medicine
Endocrinology
Family Medicine 
ENT
Gastroenterology
Lower gastrointestinal surgery
Upper gastrointestinal surgery
General Medicine
General Surgery
Intensive Care Unit
Reproductive Medicine
Neonatology
Nephrology
Neurology
Neurosurgery
Obstetrics and Gynaecology
Oncology
Surgical Oncology
Ophthalmology
Oral and maxillofacial surgery
Orthopedics
Pediatric Cardiac Surgery
Pediatric Cardiology
Pediatric Surgery
Pediatrics
Physical medicine and rehabilitation
Plastic Surgery
Reconstructive Surgery
Preventive Healthcare
Psychiatric medicine
Pulmonary Medicine
Rheumatology
Urology
Vascular Surgery.

Diagnostic departments
The diagnostic departments at MIMS include a referral diagnostic clinical laboratory, Microbiology lab, Pathology, Nuclear Medicine and Medical Imaging.

Key people
Dr Azad Moopen, Chairman 
SM Syed Khalil, Director
Dr. Abdulla Cherayakkat, Managing Director
Mr. U Basheer, executive director.

There are over 1500 employees.

References

External links

Hospital buildings completed in 2000
Hospitals established in 2000
2000 establishments in Kerala
Hospitals in Kozhikode
20th-century architecture in India